A parochial political culture is a political culture where citizens have only limited awareness of the existence of central government.

See also

References

Political culture